is the Japanese fifth tier of league football, which is part of the Japanese Regional Leagues. It covers most of the Kansai region, as well as the prefectures of Hyōgo, Kyōto, Nara, Osaka, Shiga and Wakayama. Mie, usually considered part of Kansai in non-football usage, is allotted to the Tōkai Adult Soccer League.

2023 clubs 
 Division 1 

 Division 2

Kansai Soccer League Champions

See also 
 Japanese association football league system
 Japanese Regional Leagues

References 

Kansai Soccer League official website

Football leagues in Japan
Sports leagues established in 1966